Kālidāsa was a  Sanskrit writer.

Kalidas or Kalidasa may also refer to:
Kalidas (film), a 1931 Tamil language film
Kālidāsā (crater), a crater on Mercury
Kalidasa, a genus of planthoppers
Kalidas Samman, an Indian civilian award
Kalidasa Akademi

People with the name
Kalidás Barreto (1932-2020), Português accountant and unionist, son of Goan intellectual Adeodato Barreto
Kalidas Roy (1889–1975), Bengali poet
Kalidas Shetty, Indian food scientist
Kalidas Shrestha (1923–2016), Nepali artist
Preeya Kalidas (born 1980), British singer
R. Kalidas (died 2005), Indian politician

See also
Kalida, Ohio
Kaviratna Kalidasa, a 1983 film
Mahakavi Kalidasa, a 1955 film
Mahakavi Kalidasu, a 1960 film
Mahakavi Kalidas (1942 film)

 Mahakavi Kalidas (1966 film)